Lee Sang-cheol (born 1 November 1935) is a South Korean long-distance runner. He competed in the marathon at the 1960 Summer Olympics.

References

External links
 

1935 births
Living people
Athletes (track and field) at the 1960 Summer Olympics
South Korean male long-distance runners
South Korean male marathon runners
Olympic athletes of South Korea
Sportspeople from Seoul
Olympic male marathon runners
20th-century South Korean people